Matija Ljubek (22 November 1953 – 11 October 2000) was a Croatian sprint canoeist who competed in the 1970s and 1980s and later became a sports official.

Born in Belišće, Osijek-Baranja, Ljubek competed in four Summer Olympics where he won four medals. This included two golds (C-1 1000 m: 1976, C-2 500 m: 1984 with Mirko Nišović), one silver (C-2 1000 m: 1984 with Mirko Nišović), and one bronze (C-1 500 m: 1976). His trainer was Laszlo Hingl. He also won ten medals at the ICF Canoe Sprint World Championships with four golds (C-1 1000 m: 1978, C-2 500 m: 1982, 1983; C-2 10000 m: 1985), three silvers (C-1 10000 m: 1981, C-2 1000 m: 1982, 1985), and three bronzes (C-1 10000 m: 1975, 1978; C-2 1000 m: 1983).

In 1976 he was awarded a Golden Badge award for best athlete of Yugoslavia.

Ljubek later became vice-president of the Croatian Olympic Committee and served as chef de mission for the Croatian Olympic team.

Ljubek died in 2000 when he was shot by an estranged brother-in-law while trying to defend his mother in Valpovo, Osijek-Baranja, six days after returning from the 2000 Summer Olympics.

Olympic results

References
 
 
 
 Wallechinsky, David and Jaime Loucky (2008). "Canoeing: Men's Canadian Singles 1000 Meters". In The Complete Book of the Olympics: 2008 Edition. London: Aurum Press Limited. p. 480.

Footnotes

External links
 
 

1953 births
2000 deaths
Burials at Mirogoj Cemetery
Canoeists at the 1976 Summer Olympics
Canoeists at the 1980 Summer Olympics
Canoeists at the 1984 Summer Olympics
Canoeists at the 1988 Summer Olympics
Competitors at the 1979 Mediterranean Games
Croatian male canoeists
Croatian murder victims
Croatian sports executives and administrators
Deaths by firearm in Croatia
ICF Canoe Sprint World Championships medalists in Canadian
Male murder victims
Medalists at the 1976 Summer Olympics
Medalists at the 1984 Summer Olympics
Mediterranean Games gold medalists for Yugoslavia
Mediterranean Games medalists in canoeing
Olympic bronze medalists for Yugoslavia
Olympic canoeists of Yugoslavia
Olympic gold medalists for Yugoslavia
Olympic medalists in canoeing
Olympic silver medalists for Yugoslavia
People murdered in Croatia
Yugoslav male canoeists